Coleophora atriplicis is a moth of the family Coleophoridae found in Europe and North America.

Description
The wingspan is 12–14 mm. Adults are on wing from July to August in western Europe.

The larvae feed on grass-leaved orache (Atriplex littoralis), sea purslane (Halimione portulacoides), glasswort (Salicornia species) and sea-blite (Suaeda species). They create a greyish-brown, trivalved, tubular silken case of 6.5–7 mm. The mouth angle is about 20°. The case has indistinct length lines and is scattered with dark, granular, material. Full-grown larvae can be found in October.

Distribution
Coleophora atriplicis is found from Fennoscandia and northern Russia to France, Poland and Romania and from Ireland to Ukraine. It is also found in North America, with records from Alberta, British Columbia, Nova Scotia and Washington state.

References

External links
 Coleophora atriplicis at UKmoths

atriplicis
Moths described in 1928
Moths of Europe
Moths of North America
Taxa named by Edward Meyrick